A general election was held in the U.S. state of Rhode Island on November 4, 2014. All of Rhode Island's executive officers went up for election as well as a United States Senate seat and both of Rhode Island's two seats in the United States House of Representatives. Primary elections were held on September 9, 2014.

Governor

Incumbent Democratic Governor Lincoln Chafee was eligible to run for re-election to a second term, but decided to retire. The Democratic nominee was Rhode Island Treasurer Gina Raimondo and the Republican nominee was Cranston Mayor Allan Fung. Also running were Robert J. Healey of the Moderate Party and two Independent candidates. Raimondo won the gubernatorial election.

Lieutenant Governor
Incumbent Democratic Lieutenant Governor of Rhode Island Elizabeth H. Roberts was term-limited and could run for re-election to a third term in office. Democrat Dan McKee won the 2014 general election.

Democratic primary
State Representative Frank Ferri, Cumberland Mayor Daniel McKee and Secretary of State of Rhode Island A. Ralph Mollis ran for the Democratic nomination, which McKee won with a plurality. State Senator Joshua Miller had considered running, but decided against it.

Republican primary
Catherine Terry Taylor, a former speechwriter for Senators John Chafee and Lincoln Chafee and the nominee for Secretary of State in 2010, resigned as Director of the Division of Elderly Affairs to run. She defeated Kara Young, a conservative activist and perennial candidate. Warwick Mayor Scott Avedisian had considered running, but did not do so.

General election
Also on the ballot were Moderate Party nominee William H. Gilbert, a Republican nominee for the State Senate in 2012 and Libertarian Tony Jones, a radio host and DJ. Constitution Party nominee Thomas David Gallant withdrew from the race. Democrat Dan McKee won the 2014 general election.

Results

Attorney General
Incumbent Democratic Attorney General Peter Kilmartin successfully ran for re-election to a second term in office.

Democratic primary
Kilmartin was unopposed for the Democratic nomination.

Republican primary
State Senator Dawson Hodgson was unopposed for the Republican nomination.

General election

Results

Secretary of State
Incumbent Democratic Secretary of State A. Ralph Mollis was term-limited and could not run for re-election to a third term in office. He instead ran unsuccessfully for the Democratic nomination for Lieutenant Governor. Nellie Gorbea won the 2014 general election.

Democratic primary
Former Deputy Secretary of State and former executive director of HousingWorks RI Nellie Gorbea defeated investor and candidate for Secretary of State in 2006 Guillaume de Ramel. Former State Representative and former Chairman of the Rhode Island Democratic Party Edwin R. Pacheco had declared his candidacy in April 2013, but he withdrew from the race in October 2013 and endorsed de Ramel. Providence City Councillor Terry Hassett had also considered running, but decided to run for re-election instead.

Republican primary
John Carlevale, a retired social worker and perennial candidate for public office was unopposed for the Republican nomination. Catherine Terry Taylor, a former speechwriter for Senators John Chafee and Lincoln Chafee and the nominee for Secretary of State in 2010, had considered running, but ran for Lieutenant Governor instead.

General election
Also on the ballot was Independent candidate Pamela Azar, a teacher.

Results

General Treasurer
Incumbent Democratic General Treasurer Gina Raimondo did not run for re-election to a second term in office. She instead ran successfully for Governor of Rhode Island. Seth Magaziner won the 2014 general election.

Democratic primary
Investment fund manager Seth Magaziner defeated former General Treasurer and nominee for Governor in 2010 Frank T. Caprio.

General election
No Republican filed to run for the office. Instead, the party rallied around Independent candidate Ernie Almonte, a former Democrat who served as State Auditor General from 1994 to 2010. Seth Magaziner won the general election.

Results

United States Senate

Incumbent Democratic Senator Jack Reed ran successfully for re-election to a fourth term in office. The Republican nominee was former Chairman of the Rhode Island Republican Party, former North Kingstown Town Councilman and nominee for Rhode Island's 2nd congressional district in 2008 and 2010 Mark Zaccaria.

United States House of Representatives

Both of Rhode Island's two seats in the United States House of Representatives went up for election in 2014.

References

External links

http://sos.ri.gov/candidates/

http://wpri.com/2014/06/25/almonte-now-running-for-treasurer-as-independent/

http://www.providencejournal.com/politics/content/20140630-r.i.-gop-chair-says-caprio-considered-making-comeback-bid-as-a-republican.ece

http://wpri.com/2014/08/19/wpri-projo-primary-poll-aug-2014-magaziner-caprio/

http://www.rifuture.org/frank-caprio-runs-for-redemption-just-found-a-political-party.html

http://www.providencejournal.com/breaking-news/content/20140622-r.i.-democrats-endorse-frank-caprio-for-treasurer-slate-of-incumbents.ece

Ballotpedia (Rhode Island elections, 2014)